Jordana Nye, better known by just her first name, is an American bedroom pop musician.

Early life
Nye's father was an organist at her local church. Upon being recommended by her father, Nye decided to take up an instrument, starting on violin before moving to guitar.

Career
When Jordana was eighteen years old, she released an album titled Classical Notions of Happiness. The album received positive reviews and garnered enough attention that the record label Grand Jury offered to sign her and re-release the album in 2020.

On June 30, 2020, Nye announced plans to release an EP. Titled Something to Say, the EP was released July 31. The EP received four out of five stars from NME. On September 15, Nye announced plans to release a follow up EP titled To You. The two EPs were combined to form Jordana's second full-length album, titled Something to Say... To You. The album was released on December 4.

On February 8 of 2022, Jordana released a single titled "Catch My Drift" via Grand Jury Music.

Discography

Studio albums
Classical Notions of Happiness (2019; re-released in 2020)
Something to Say to You (2020)
Face The Wall (2022)
EPs
Something to Say (2020)
...To You (2020)
Summer's Over, with TV Girl (2021)
I'm Doing Well, Thanks for Asking (2022)

References

Musicians from Kansas
Bedroom pop musicians
Living people
2000 births